Keratin, type I cytoskeletal 10 also known as cytokeratin-10 (CK-10) or keratin-10 (K10)  is a protein that in humans is encoded by the KRT10 gene. Keratin 10 is a type I keratin.

Function 

Keratin-10 is a member of the type I (acidic) cytokeratin family, which belongs to the superfamily of intermediate filament (IF) proteins. Keratins are heteropolymeric structural proteins which form the intermediate filament. These filaments, along with actin microfilaments and microtubules, compose the cytoskeleton of epithelial cells. Mutations in this gene are associated with epidermolytic hyperkeratosis. This gene is located within a cluster of keratin family members on chromosome 17q21.

Interactions
Keratin 10 has been shown to interact with AKT1.

See also
34βE12 (keratin 903)

References

Further reading

Keratins